The 2nd AIBA American 2004 Olympic Boxing Qualifying Tournament was held in Rio de Janeiro, Brazil from April 4 to April 11, 2004. The competition was the final opportunity for amateur boxers from North-, Central- and South America to qualify for the 2004 Summer Olympics (the only other places were already allocated at the 2003 Pan American Games). The top two boxers in each weight division gained a place in the Olympics, with the exception of the heavyweight and super heavyweight divisions in which just the winner was entered.

Medal winners

Qualified

Light Flyweight (– 48 kg)

Flyweight (– 51 kg)

Bantamweight (– 54 kg)

Featherweight (– 57 kg)

Lightweight (– 60 kg)

Light Welterweight (– 64 kg)

Welterweight (– 69 kg)

Middleweight (– 75 kg)

Light Heavyweight (– 81 kg)

Heavyweight (– 91 kg)

Super Heavyweight (+ 91 kg)

See also
Boxing at the 2003 Pan American Games
1st AIBA American 2004 Olympic Qualifying Tournament

References
amateur-boxing

American 2
2004 in Brazilian sport